Trapped In Crime is the third studio album by American rapper C-Murder released on September 5, 2000 on No Limit Records, TRU Records and Priority Records. The album was produced by Jermaine Dupri, Donald XL Robertson, Carlos Stephens, Ke'Noe and more. The album features guest appearances by Fat Joe, Snoop Dogg, Da Brat, Jermaine Dupri, Silkk the Shocker, Young Gunz and more Trapped In Crime was another success for C-Murder peaking at #9 on the Billboard 200 and becoming his third straight album to land in the top 10 on the Billboard 200 chart while simultaneously making it to #1 on the Top R&B/Hip-Hop Albums selling 156,000 copies in its first week.

Singles
In addition, the single "Down for My N's" is affiliated with Phi Beta Sigma and was quoted in many later rap songs, such as by Lil Wayne in 2 Chainz' song "Yuck!", by Tyga in Hit 'Em Up, by Future in DJ Khaled's "No New Friends", by Kanye West in Blood on the Leaves, and many more. It peaked at #29 on the Hot R&B/Hip-Hop Singles & Tracks. "Hustlin'" peaked at #14 on the Canadian Hot 100.

Track listing

Chart positions

Weekly charts

Year-end charts

Singles
"Down for My N's"

Hustlin

See also
List of number-one R&B albums of 2000 (U.S.)

References

2000 albums
Albums produced by Bryan-Michael Cox
Albums produced by Jermaine Dupri
Albums produced by L.T. Hutton
C-Murder albums
No Limit Records albums
Priority Records albums